Chinese honorifics and honorific language are words, word constructs, and expressions in the Chinese language that convey self-deprecation, social respect, politeness, or deference. Once ubiquitously employed in ancient China, a large percent has fallen out of use in the contemporary Chinese lexicon. The promotion of vernacular Chinese during the New Culture Movement of the 1910s and 1920s in China further hastened the demise of a large body of Chinese honorifics previously preserved in the vocabulary and grammar of Classical Chinese.

Although Chinese honorifics have simplified to a large degree, contemporary Chinese still retains a sizable set of honorifics. Many of the classical constructs are also occasionally employed by contemporary speakers to convey formality, humility, politeness or respect. Usage of classical Chinese honorifics is also found frequently in contemporary Chinese literature and television or cinematic productions that are set in the historical periods. Honorific language in Chinese is achieved by using honorific or beautifying alternatives, prefixing or suffixing a word with a polite complement, or by dropping casual-sounding words.

In general, there are five distinct categories of honorific language:

 Respectful Language, which is used when referring to others to show deference and politeness.
 Humble Language, which is used when referring to oneself in a self-deprecating manner to show humbleness and humility.
 Indirect Language, which is the use of euphemisms or tactful language to approach sensitive topics and show respect.
 Courteous Language, which employs praising and laudatory words or phrases with the intent to flatter the addressee.
 Elegant Language, which employs elegant and beautiful expressions and words in lieu of more casual words and phrases to describe people, objects, actions or concepts.

See also 

Chinese titles
Chinese pronouns
Chinese kinship
Chinese idioms

References

Further reading 
 Yuling Pan, Dániel Z. Kádár: Politeness In Historical and Contemporary Chinese. A Comparative Analysis. London / New York: Continuum, 2011; .